The women's 200 metres at the 2002 European Athletics Championships were held at the Olympic Stadium on August 8–9.

Medalists

Results

Heats
Qualification: First 3 of each heat (Q) and the next 4 fastest (q) qualified for the semifinals.

Wind:Heat 1: -1.1 m/s, Heat 2: -0.6 m/s, Heat 3: 0.0 m/s, Heat 4: -0.8 m/s

Semifinals
Qualification: First 4 of each semifinal (Q) qualified directly for the final.

Wind:Heat 1: +1.0 m/s, Heat 2: 0.0 m/s

Final
Wind: -0.3 m/s

External links

Events at the 2002 European Athletics Championships
200 metres at the European Athletics Championships
2002 in women's athletics